Emilia Migliaccio (born April 25, 1999) is an American amateur golfer. In 2019, she won the gold medal in the women's individual event at the Pan American Games held in Lima, Peru. Migliaccio, Brandon Wu, Stewart Hagestad and Rose Zhang also won the gold medal in the mixed team event.

Amateur wins
2014 IJGA Junior Open, Greg Norman Champions Golf Academy Junior Championship
2015 Scott Robertson Memorial, Western National Junior Championship, Davis Love III Junior Open, IZOD AJGA Championship
2016 Scott Robertson Memorial
2017 Scott Robertson Memorial, Mercedes-Benz Intercollegiate
2018 The Sally, Ruth's Chris Tar Heel Invite
2019 Harder Hall Women's Invitational, Bryan National Collegiate, ACC Championship, Pan American Games (gold medal)
2020 Darius Rucker Intercollegiate
2022 North and South Women's Amateur

Source:

U.S. national team appearances
Junior Ryder Cup: 2016 (winners)
Junior Solheim Cup: 2017 (winners)
Arnold Palmer Cup: 2018 (winners), 2019, 2020, 2021 (winners)
The Spirit International Amateur Golf Championship: 2019
Curtis Cup: 2021 (winners), 2022 (winners)

Source:

Reference

External links
 

American female golfers
Amateur golfers
Wake Forest Demon Deacons women's golfers
Golfers at the 2019 Pan American Games
Medalists at the 2019 Pan American Games
Pan American Games medalists in golf
Pan American Games gold medalists for the United States
1999 births
Living people
20th-century American women
21st-century American women